Lee Chih-feng (born 11 April 1980) is a Taiwanese judoka. He competed in the men's middleweight event at the 2000 Summer Olympics.

References

1980 births
Living people
Taiwanese male judoka
Olympic judoka of Taiwan
Judoka at the 2000 Summer Olympics
Place of birth missing (living people)